The fourth season of Akademi Fantasia premiered on the Astro Ria television channel on 3 June 2006. The season introduced Adlin Aman Ramlie as a replacement for Kudsia Kahar, while Aznil Nawawi returned as host once again. On 5 August 2006, a native of Marang, Terengganu, Mohammad Faizal Ramly won the season, defeating runner-up Lotter P. Edwin Edin. Faizal remained the last male winner until the seventh season.

As much as 20 short-listed contestants were revealed in Tirai Akademi Fantasia, which was aired on 20 May 2006. However, all contestants were required to perform in the Prelude Concert in order to determine the final 12 contestants who would move on to the main competition in which 10 contestants would be chosen by the jury and the remaining two contestants by the audience's votes.

The weekly concerts were held in MBPJ Civic Hall while the final concert was held in Stadium Putra Bukit Jalil. This season also witnessed an elimination of a student in the first concert, an Akademi Fantasia first. The entire season attracted as much as 7.4 million votes.

Concert Summaries

Week 1 
Original Airdate: 3 June 2006

Bottom two: Nordawati Daud & Velvet Laurence Aduk
Eliminated: Nordawati Daud
Special judges: Ahmad Fauzee & Hajah Wan Chik Daud

Week 2 
Original Airdate: 11 June 2006

Bottom two: Karen Tan Lee Suan & Richael L. Gimbang
Eliminated: Karen Tan Lee Suan
Special judges: Bob Lokman & Francisca Peter

Week 3 
Original Airdate: 18 June 2006

Bottom two: Nor Salima Habibi & Richael L. Gimbang
Eliminated: Richael L. Gimbang
Special judges: Deja Moss & M. Rajoli

Week 4 
Original Airdate: 24 June 2006

Bottom two: Nor Salima Habibi & Nur Azilah Seeron
Eliminated: Nur Azilah Seeron
Special judges: Harun Salim Bachik & Noraniza Idris

Week 5 
Original Airdate: 1 July 2006

Bottom two: Nor Salima Habibi & Syamsul Hirdy Muhid
Eliminated: Nor Salima Habibi
Special judges: Cik Mat Poi & Juliza Adlizan

Week 6 
Original Airdate: 8 July 2006

Bottom two: Amirul Azwan Mohd. Ghazali & Syamsul Hirdy Muhid
Eliminated: Syamsul Hirdy Muhid
Special judges: Adnan Abu Hassan & Raja Azura

Week 7 
Original Airdate: 15 July 2006

Bottom two: Hazwan Haziq Rosebi & Lotter P.Edwin Edin
Eliminated: Lotter P.Edwin Edin
Special judges: Edry KRU & Siti Nurhaliza

Week 8 
Original Airdate: 22 July 2006

Bottom two: Amirul Azwan Mohd. Ghazali & Hazwan Haziq Rosebi
Eliminated: Amirul Azwan Mohd. Ghazali
Special judges: Datin Seri Tiara Jacquelina & Siti Hajar Ismail

Week 9 
Original Airdate: 29 July 2006

Bottom two: Hazwan Haziq Rosebi & Velvet Laurence Aduk
Eliminated: None
Student who was recruited: Lotter P.Edwin Edin
Special judges: Liza Hanim & Sharifah Shahirah

Week 10 
Original Airdate: 5 August 2006

Fifth: Velvet Lawrence Aduk
Fourth: Hazwan Haziq Rosebi
Third: Nur Farhan binti Azizan
Runner-Up: Lotter P.Edwin Edin
Winner: Mohammad Faizal Ramly
Special judges: Mamat Khalid & Siti Hajar Ismail

Students
(ages stated are at time of contest)

Post Akademi Fantasia Careers

Richael L. Gimbang signed with EAD Entertainment and became the main vocalist of music band Estranged. In 2006, his band won the award Favourite Band at ERA Award. His group also won Best Rock and Best Video at Motorola Malaysian English Top 10.
Nur Azilah Seeron has released her first album in 2006, Realiti.
Syamsul Hirdy Muhid also known as Diddy Hirdy has his duet single released with Yanie entitled Saling Terpesona. Released his first album in 2007 and "Hilang" is in the top charts of all radio stations. Nominated for Anugerah Planet Muzik 2008 for Best New Male Artist, Anugerah Bintang Popular 2007 for Most Popular New Male Artist, Finalist for Anugerah Era 2007[Favorite Male Vocal, Favorite Duo Vocal (Saling Terpesona), Favorite Pop Song (Hilang) and Most Promising Artist].
Hazwan Haziq Rosebi appeared in several concerts organized by Istana Budaya and Ministry of Culture, Art & Heritage in Kuala Lumpur, and Jakarta.
Nur Farhan Azizan was nominated in several prestigious award in Malaysia such as in 2007 ERA Award for Favorite Female Vocal; 2007 Planet Music Award for Best New Female Artist; and also 2007 Anugerah Industri Muzik for Best New Artist and Best Vocal in Album. She has also recorded a theme song for Malam Sehati Berdansa in Astro Ria, and also a theme song for a serial drama Cinta & Keadilan entitled Kau Cinta.
Mohammad Faizal Ramly was chosen as the Ambassador for Mamee slurp in 2006. He has released his first album Datanglah in 2007.

Summaries

Elimination chart

 The student won the competition
 The student was the runner-up
 The student was the first runner-up
 The students were finalists
 The student was eliminated
 The student was the original eliminee but was saved
 The students were voted by the audience to enter the competition
 The student was re-entered into the competition through AFMASUK

In Week Prelude, the pool of 20 contestants were reduced to 12 who moved on to the main competition as the new AF students. However, this first call-out does not reflect their performance that first week. Additionally, Nora and Amirul were voted by the audience through SMS to enter the competition.
 In Week 9, there was no elimination. Additionally, Lotter was re-entered into the competition after scoring the highest votes through AFMASUK.

Cast members

Host
Aznil Nawawi

Professional Trainers
Ramli Sarip - Academy Principal
Ajai - Vocal Presentation
Fauziah Nawi - Drama Presentation
Corrie Lee & Linda Jasmine - Choreographer
Shamril Saleh - Music Director
Dr. Fazley Yaacob - Motivation Consultor
Kevin Zahri - Health Consultor
Shafizawati Sharif - Technical Vocal

Judge
Adlin Aman Ramlie

Season Statistics
Total number of students: 12
Oldest students: Lotter P.Edwin Edin & Richael G. Limbang, both 25 years old
Youngest students: Amirul Azwan Mohd. Ghazali, Hazwan Haziq Rosebi, Nor Salima Habibi, & Nur Azilah Seeron, all 19 years old
Tallest student: Syamsul Hirdy Muhid, 6'0" (183 cm)
Shortest student: Karen Tan Lee Suan
Heaviest student: Velvet Lawrence Aduk 147.7 lb (67 kg)
Top 3's vote mean (excluding finale): Mohammad Faizal Ramly - 2.0, Lotter P.Edwin Edin - 3.74, Nur Farhan Azizan - 1.78
Top 3's vote median (excluding finale): Mohammad Faizal Ramly - 2, Lotter P.Edwin Edin - 4, Nur Farhan Azizan - 1
Student with the most consecutive highest votes: Nur Farhan Azizan, 6 times
Student with the most collective highest votes: Nur Farhan Azizan, 6 times
Students with the most consecutive bottom two appearances: Hazwan Haziq Rosebi & Nor Salima Habibi, both 3 times
Students with the most collective bottom two appearances: Hazwan Haziq Rosebi & Nor Salima Habibi, both 3 times
Students with no bottom two appearances: Mohammad Faizal Ramly & Nur Farhan Azizan

References

External links
 Official Site

Akademi Fantasia seasons
2006 Malaysian television seasons